This is a list of notable events in country music that took place in the year 1946.

Events

Top hits of the year

Number one hits
(As certified by Billboard magazine)

Top Hillbilly (Country) Recordings 1946

Billboard Most-Played Folk Records of 1946 is a year-end list compiled by The Billboard, printed in the January 4, 1947 issue. It includes rankings for the calendar year only, handicapping records at the beginning and end of the year such as "The Old Lamp-Lighter", which lost more than half of its points. For all year-end charts on these pages, records that enter the chart in December of the previous year, or remain on the chart after December of the current year, receive points for their full chart runs. Each week, a score of 15 points is assigned for the no. 1 record, 9 points for no. 2, 8 points for no. 3, and so on, and the total of all weeks determined the final rank. Additional information can also be found at List of Most Played Juke Box Folk Records number ones of 1946.

Top new album releases

Births 
 January 11 — Naomi Judd, mother half of The Judds (died 2022).
 January 19 — Dolly Parton, major multi-faceted country star since the 1960s.
 March 20 — Ranger Doug, "The Idol of American Youth", member of Riders in the Sky.
 July 15 — Linda Ronstadt, singer-songwriter with strong influences in both country and rock music.
 August 11 — John Conlee, former mortician and disc jockey who became one of the most consistent performers of the late 1970s and 1980s.
 October 2 — Jo-El Sonnier, Singer-songwriter and accordionist who perform country music and Cajun music.
 November 2 — Howard Bellamy, of The Bellamy Brothers.
 November 5 — Gram Parsons, influential country rock and alt-country singer-songwriter-guitarist who was a member of such bands as The Byrds and The Flying Burrito Brothers, as well as a solo act (died 1973).
 December 11 — Tony Brown, record producer.
 December 25 — Jimmy Buffett, singer best known for his "island escapism"-styled music.

Deaths 
 July 13 – Riley Puckett, 52, vocalist with the Skillet Lickers (blood poisoning).

Further reading 
 Kingsbury, Paul, "Vinyl Hayride: Country Music Album Covers 1947–1989," Country Music Foundation, 2003
 Millard, Bob, "Country Music: 70 Years of America's Favorite Music," HarperCollins, New York, 1993
 Whitburn, Joel. "Top Country Songs 1944–2005 – 6th Edition." 2005.

References

Country
Country music by year